Inqhana (Quechua for fuel, also spelled Inganna) is a mountain in the Andes of Peru, about  high. It is located in the Huancavelica Region, Huancavelica Province, Huacocolpa District. Inqhana lies north of Yawarqucha and Atuq Marka.

References

Mountains of Huancavelica Region
Mountains of Peru